Youngcare is an Australian non-for-profit organisation founded in 2005 to assist people between the ages of 16 to 65 with high physical support needs. Youngcare's programs and projects focus on supporting young people with a physical disability by providing greater choice in housing and care options. Currently, there are over 3,340 young people with high physical support needs living in residential aged care facilities. Common types of disability of those supported by Youngcare include cerebral palsy, multiple sclerosis or an acquired brain injury.

Mission
Youngcare is fighting for freedom, dignity and choice for young people with high physical support needs to choose where they live, who they live with, and how they live their lives. To ensure every young Australian with disability is living a young life, Youngcare develops aspirational Specialist Disability Accommodation (SDA), advocates for much-needed policy change, delivers vital grants programs, and provides education, advice and pathways through a free support service.

History 
Founded in 2005, Youngcare was born out of a young man's battle to find relevant and dignified care for his wife. Youngcare's inspiration, Shevaune Conry, was diagnosed with multiple sclerosis in 1998 aged 26. By age 33, her husband and Youngcare founder, David Conry, could no longer provide the specialized medical care at home that Shevaune needed on a 24-hour basis. After searching for an age-appropriate care provider, Shevaune was presented no alternative other than to move into aged care. It was this experience of the disability system that drove David, with co-founders Nick Bonifant, Matthew Lawson and Simon Lockyer, to create Youngcare and provide choice to young people who require full-time care. Shevaune died in August 2012 at age 40.

Programs

Youngcare Housing
Youngcare housing supports young people's choice to live young lives in quality, Specialist Disability Accommodation (SDA). From investment and procurement, to design and development to final delivery and ongoing tenancy management, Youngcare offers premium residential options for young people with high physical support needs. Since the introduction of the National Disability Insurance Scheme (NDIS) and Specialist Disability Accommodation (SDA), Youngcare are able to provide more choice and control to people living with physical disabilities through various housing options nationally.

Youngcare Grants  
At Home Care Grants

Youngcare's At Home Care Grants program began in 2009 and is critical in keeping young people at home with their families, and preventing new admissions to inappropriate housing. The grants provide one-off funding up to $10,000 for equipment, home modifications and essential support/respite that is unable to be funded through other means (e.g.. NDIS) and goes beyond items that are considered ‘reasonable and necessary’, instead focusing on increasing support and quality of life. Youngcare has facilitated over $8,000,000 of funding, with successful applications for items such as essential home modifications, equipment and in-home support.

Home Support Grants (HSG)

The Youngcare Home Support Grants provide essential funding that is critical for people to either remain living at home with some more help, or to return to the community from inappropriate housing such as aged care. Up to $20,000 is available in extreme situations for essential equipment, home modifications and services, household items and utilities to ensure an increase in the individuals quality of life. This grant aims to bridge the gap in essential services where there is clear evidence of need, or during the transitional period while individuals gain access to the NDIS.

Youngcare Connect 
The Youngcare Connect Support Service supports families and individuals to navigate the often-complicated health, housing and disability systems. From providing expert NDIS and SDA advice, linking people with appropriate services to identifying funding or housing opportunities Youngcare Connect is run by a dedicated, compassionate and qualified team of friendly specialists, clinicians and outreach staff.

References

External links
 

Health charities in Australia
2005 establishments in Australia
Charities for disabled people
Disability organisations based in Australia
Medical and health organisations based in Queensland